David Blocker (born May 4, 1955) is an American film producer. He is the son of actor Dan Blocker, and the older brother of actor Dirk Blocker. In 1998, he won an Emmy for producing Don King: Only in America.

Filmography
He was a producer in all films unless otherwise noted.

Film

Music department

Production manager

As an actor

Second unit director or assistant director

Sound department

Thanks

Television

As an actor

References

External links

Place of birth missing (living people)
American film producers
Living people
1955 births
Unit production managers